Goonengerry is a locality located in the Northern Rivers Region of New South Wales.

History 
Goonengerry is located within the traditional areas of the Bundjalung people and is an Aboriginal term meaning where the wind meets the wind.
 
In the 2016 census, Goonengerry had a population of 366 people.

References 

Towns in New South Wales
Northern Rivers